During the 1990–91 English football season, Southampton competed in the Football League First Division.

Season summary
In the 1990–91 season, Southampton had a disappointing campaign, finding themselves at the bottom half of the table for most of the season. On 16 March they lost 4–3 at home to Everton and sat only four points clear of the relegation places, but four wins from their final nine league games of the season saved them from relegation. At the end of the season, their manager Chris Nicholl was sacked and was replaced by Ian Branfoot, who was assistant to Steve Coppell at Crystal Palace.

Final league table

Results summary

Results by round

Results
Southampton's score comes first

Legend

Football League First Division

FA Cup

League Cup

Full Members Cup

Squad

Transfers

In

Out

Transfers in:  £1,600,000
Transfers out:  £0
Total spending:  £1,600,000

References

Southampton F.C. seasons
Southampton